Kondapuram is a town in YSR Kadapa district of the Indian state of Andhra Pradesh. It is located in Kondapuram mandal of Jammalamadugu revenue division.

It belongs to Rayalaseema region . It is located 89 KM towards west from District head quarters Kadapa. It is a Mandal head quarter.

According to 2011 Census, Kondapuram Local Language is Telugu. Kondapuram town Total population is 6433 and number of houses are 1551. Female Population is 52.0%. town literacy rate is 67.3% and the Female Literacy rate is 31.7%.

An old Zilla Parishad High Schools exists and the building of the school made by British Indian time, The quality of education is high as compare to other government schools in the district.

Near this town Gandikota Dam backwater was accumulated and due to this, many small village are affected and people's lives become terrible as everyone houses merged into that water. 

AP govt yet to rebuild this town and villages (No schools, No colleges, No APSRTC Bus station, No parks, No recreation facilities, No Libraries, No proper roads.... are available) and this mandal is least counted by the government. No matter who comes into the power.

In fact there are no govt buildings constructed yet. Like police station, MRO, MPDO, MEO.

Finally, government officials hardly visit this town and surrounding villages.

References 

Villages in Kadapa district